Barefoot and Pregnant is the fifth studio album by the Los Angeles-based pop-punk band The Dollyrots. It was released on Arrested Youth Records, February 18, 2014.

Track listing

Personnel 
Kelly Ogden – bass, vocals
Luis Cabezas – guitar, vocals, recording, production
Stacy Jones – drums
Amy Wood – drums
Ruby Fields – Viola on "Nightlight"
Phillip Calhoun – Glockenspiel on "Nightlight"
River Ogden Cabezas – Fetal Heartbeat in "Under the Same Sky"
John Fields – production, additional percussion, keys, and FX
Stephen Marsh – mastering
Jack Daniel Cozzi, Tish Ciravolo, Morgan McGinnis, Tom Calhoun, Phillip Calhoun, Risty Perez, Stacy Jones, and John FIelds – background vocals

Reception

Critical reception

PopMatters gave the album seven out of ten stars, saying "there’s more variety and nuance here than ever before; jokey hardcore runs seamlessly into mid-tempo stomps and bad-girl anthems, all powered by Luis Cabezas’ satisfyingly fuzzy guitars and delivered with an economy (13 songs in 37 minutes) that would have made Dee Dee and the boys proud. Barefoot and Pregnant is deeply hooky, melodic, wacky and at least as delightfully bratty as 2007’s Because I’m Awesome."

At Alternative Press, Jason Schreurs rated the album two out of five stars, calling the vast majority of the album is "way too predictable, feeling overly long at 13 songs"

Charts

References

External links
The Dollyrots homepage

2014 albums
The Dollyrots albums
Albums produced by John Fields (record producer)